Witty is a free Twitter client for Microsoft Windows released under the open source New BSD License and powered by the Windows Presentation Foundation. Witty was developed with Microsoft Visual Studio 2008 and Expression Blend.

Features
 Keyboard Shortcuts
 Skins and Skinning
 Spell Checking
 Minimize to the System Tray
 Fullscreen mode when maximized

References

Twitter services and applications